Keith Wright may refer to:
 Keith Wright (wide receiver) (born 1956), former NFL football wide receiver
 Keith Wright (defensive tackle) (born 1980), former NFL football defensive tackle
 Keith Wright (Australian politician) (1942–2015), former Australian politician
 Keith Wright (footballer) (born 1965), Scottish former international footballer who played as a striker
 Keith Wright (ice hockey) (born 1944), retired Canadian professional ice hockey right winger
 Keith L. T. Wright (born 1955), American politician, member of the New York State Assembly
 Keith Wright (basketball) (born 1989), basketball player who played for the Harvard Crimson